Ayres Phillips Merrill (1825–September 16, 1883) was an American planter and diplomat. He was the owner of a plantation in Adams County, Mississippi, and he served as the United States Minister Resident to Belgium from May 1876 to November 1877.  He graduated from Harvard University in 1845. He and his family lived at Elms Court in Natchez.

He was the son of another Ayres Phillips Merrill, a physician.

References

1825 births
1883 deaths
People from Adams County, Mississippi
American planters
Ambassadors of the United States to Belgium
Harvard University alumni